SurveyUSA is a polling firm in the United States.  It conducts market research for corporations and interest groups, but is best known for conducting opinion polls for various political offices and questions. SurveyUSA conducts these opinion polls under contract by over 50 television stations (who also use the SurveyUSA market research to fine-tune their newscasts for higher ratings).
The difference between SurveyUSA and other telephone polling firms is twofold.  First, SurveyUSA does not use live call center employees, but an automated system.  Taped questions are asked of the respondent by a professional announcer (usually a local news anchor), and the respondent is invited to press a button on their touch tone telephone or record a message at a prompt designating their selection.  Secondly, SurveyUSA uses more concise language, especially for ballot propositions, than competitors.  This can lead to diverging results, such as for California Proposition 76, where one version of the SurveyUSA question with a one sentence description, polled significantly differently compared to another version with a three sentence description (which was similar to a version of the question used by other pollsters, which used a five or six sentence question).

SurveyUSA is owned by Hypotenuse, Inc., a privately held company in New Jersey.

As of November 2019, the polling analysis website FiveThirtyEight, led by statistician Nate Silver, had 790 SurveyUSA polls in its database, and gave SurveyUSA an "A" grade on the basis of its historical accuracy and methodology. FiveThirtyEight listed SurveyUSA as having a 89% accuracy rate in calling elections.

References

External links
SurveyUSA web site
SurveyUSA President Jay Leve interviewed by The Hotline, National Journal's Daily Briefing on Politics
Article from Public Opinion Quarterly by Mark Blumenthal, author of the Mystery Pollster blog, in which Blumenthal discusses advantages and disadvantages of the automated survey technology used in SurveyUSA's polls.

Public opinion research companies in the United States